Charles Borck (January 4, 1917 – February 6, 2008) was a Filipino basketball player. Born in Quiapo, Manila, Philippines of a German father and a Spanish mother, he was nicknamed The Blonde Bombshell because of his blond hair and good looks. A 6'1" center, he played for the San Beda Red Lions men's senior basketball team and later for the Philippines at the 1936 Summer Olympics where he was the tallest member of the latter team.

After retiring from active play, Borck settled in Las Vegas, Nevada, United States in 1949. By the time of his death in 2008, he was the 1936 Philippine men's Olympic basketball team's last surviving member. He became one of the first inductees into the Philippine National Basketball Hall of Fame in 1999 along with fellow 1936 Olympic basketball team members Ambrosio Padilla, Jacinto Ciria Cruz and Primitivo Martinez.

References

External links
 

1917 births
2008 deaths
Basketball players at the 1936 Summer Olympics
Centers (basketball)
Filipino expatriate basketball people in the United States
Filipino people of German descent
Filipino people of Spanish descent
Filipino Roman Catholics
Olympic basketball players of the Philippines
People from Quiapo, Manila
Sportspeople from the Las Vegas Valley
Filipino emigrants to the United States
Basketball players from Manila
Philippines men's national basketball team players
Filipino men's basketball players
San Beda Red Lions basketball players